Mohamed Salim Obeid  is a football player from the United Arab Emirates who played as a midfielder for United Arab Emirates in the 1984 Asian Cup.

References
Stats

Emirati footballers
United Arab Emirates international footballers
1984 AFC Asian Cup players
Living people
UAE Pro League players
Association football midfielders
Year of birth missing (living people)